Talat Ahmad is an Indian Earth scientist and professor at department of geology, University of Delhi. He commenced his second stint as vice chancellor of University of Kashmir on 6 August 2018 after serving as vice chancellor of Jamia Millia Islamia after he resigned from the post a few months short of his full term. He was shortlisted by a committee constituted by the governor to shortlist a panel for the post. He had earlier taken over as vice-chancellor of University of Kashmir from Professor Riyaz Punjabi on 1 June 2011. Prior to this, he was teaching geology at the University of Delhi.

Ahmad was selected to serve a second term as vice chancellor University of Kashmir after he was selected by Governor of Jammu and Kashmir Narinder Nath Vohra in his capacity as chancellor of the State University. He was handed over charge by Professor Khurshid Iqbal Andrabi who had been serving as officiating vice-chancellor since October 2017 after his tenure was over.

During his first tenure, Ahmad was recommended for the position of vice-chancellor, University of Kashmir by a search committee headed by former member of Planning Commission, Prof. Abid Hussain, former Indian ambassador to the US, and comprising Professor G. K. Chadha, CEO, South Asian University and former vice-chancellor, Jawaharlal Nehru University, and Prof. Seyed E. Hasnain, an eminent scientist and former vice-chancellor of University of Hyderabad.

Ahmad is the first vice chancellor to serve a second term and the second vice chancellor to be appointed from outside the state of Jammu and Kashmir in the past two decades. Jalees Ahmad Khan Tareen was the first vice-chancellor from outside the state who ran office from 2001 to 2004.

Early life 

Ahmad was born and brought up in a small town of Giridih, Jharkhand. His father was Moinuddin Ahmad.

Education 

Ahmad did his schooling from Giridih Higher Secondary School. In 1977, he joined Aligarh Muslim University to pursue MSc in geology. He completed M Phil in Ore Petrology from Jawaharlal Nehru University in 1980 and in 1985, he completed his PhD in Igneous Petrology from JNU.

He did a postdoctoral fellowship with University of Leicester during 1988–89 under a Government of India Fellowship and another from University of Cambridge under Natural Environment Research Council (NERC) during 1997–98. In 1999–2000, he did another postdoctoral fellowship under Japanese Society for Promotion of Science (JSPS) with Nagoya University, Japan.

Career 

In 1979, Ahmad got selected in the UPSC and started working as a junior geologist with the Geological Survey of India (GSI) and formally joined GSI in February 1980. He worked there for a year, but left it soon after as for him, it was more of a survey and less of research. Later, he worked as a Scientist-B with Wadia Institute of Himalayan Geology, Dehra Dun from 16 July 1984 to 3 September 1989. Ahmad worked at the Wadia Institute of Himalayan Geology, Dehra Dun, as a scientist under DST for nineteen years (1984–2003).

He joined department of geology, University of Delhi as professor on 31 October 2003. There he started a project in central India and Rajasthan, in addition to research work in Himalayas. He got another project, Russian Foundation for Basic Research (RFBR) after coming to the valley of Kashmir.

He took over as vice-chancellor of University of Kashmir on 1 June 2011.

On 29 April 2014, Ahmad was appointed as the vice-chancellor of Jamia Millia Islamia, New Delhi. Pursuant to the permission of the chancellor of the university, Ahmad was relieved from the post by A M Shah, dean of academic affairs of the university. Ahmad joined Jamia Millia Islamia on 15 May 2014, taking over from officiating vice-chancellor Prof S M Sajid and thus succeeded Najeeb Jung after he was sworn in as the 20th lieutenant governor of Delhi in April 2013.

In 2018, Ahmad was appointed as vice-chancellor of Kashmir University for the second time.

Research 

Ahmad has over 65 research publications to his credit. He has supervised several M.Phil. and PhD research studies at the University of Delhi and the Research School of Earth Sciences, Australian National University, Canberra, Australia.

He has been working on various sponsored projects, including Geochemical, Isotopic and Geochronological characterisation of Granotoids from the Central Indian Tectonic Zones (CITZ) and Central Indian Shear Zones (CISZ)-Constraints on Pre-cambrian Crystal Evolution, funded by Indo-Russian, ILTP Project, and Proterozoic mafic magmatism in the Central Indian Tectonic Zone (CITZ): elemental and isotopic constraints on crystal evolution and geodynamics.

Fellowships and awards 

Ahmad had the memberships of many was a recipient of the following fellowships and awards:

Fellow of Indian Academy of Sciences, Bangalore
Fellow of Indian National Science Academy, New Delhi
Fellow of National Academy of Sciences, Allahabad 
National Mineral Award, from the Government of India in 1994.
J C Bose National Fellowship 2011
S.M. Naqvi Gold Medal 2013

Memberships and honours 

Ahmad bore memberships of prestigious societies and was a recipient of many prestigious honours.

Life member and executive committee member of Alumni Association of JNU (JNU, New Delhi)
Life member of Mineralogical Society of India
Honorary research associate of the department of geology, University of Leicester, UK
Associate member, Wadia Institute of Himalayan Geology Society
Member, editorial advisory board of the Indian Journal of Geochemistry
Member, advisory committee for DRS, Department of Geology, University of Rajasthan, Jaipur
Member, expert panel for the Science and Engineering Research Council
Member, National Assessment and Accreditation Council (NAAC) UGC
Member, "Deep Continental Studies Programme" of the Department of Science and Technology, New Delhi
Convener, Vision Committee for Perspective Planning for the Academic Activities of Department of Geology, University of Delhi, Delhi 
Regional coordinator, International Geological Correlation Programme, member, Working Group for Geology for the National Science Digital Library Under the National Institute of Science Communication and Information Resources, CSIR
Regional coordinator, International Geological Correlation Programme (IGCP) Project 516 on the "Geological anatomy of East and South East Asia" 
Member, editorial board for Indian Journal of Geology
Member, Working Group for Geology for the National Science Digital Library (NSDL) Under the National Institute of Science Communication and Information Resources, CSIR, New Delhi
Member, editorial board for Earth, Environmental and Planetary Sciences
Member, Expert Group for 'Electron Probe Micro-Analyzer (EPMA) National Facility at IIT Kharagpur' under the Science & Engineering Research Council, Department of Science & Technology, New Delhi
Member, editorial board for Journal of Virtual Explorer, an electronic journal from Monash University, Australia. ISSN Number: 1441-8126 (Printed Journal); 1441-8142 (Online Journal) and 1441–8134 (CD-ROM Journal) 
Member, editorial board of the Journal of the Mineralogical Society of India 
Member, editorial board of the Gondwana Geological Magazine
Member, editorial board of the Journal of the Geological Society of India
Member, editorial board Of the Journal of Earth System Science
Member, Expert Group for FIST North East, DST, New Delhi
Member, Board of Research Studies for the Faculty of Sciences, Department of Geology and Geophysics, University of Kashmir

References

External links 
 Member page on Delhi University Official Website
 CV on Kashmir University Official Website
 

1955 births
20th-century Indian earth scientists
Vice-Chancellors of the University of Kashmir
Academic staff of Delhi University
Indian geologists
Aligarh Muslim University alumni
Jawaharlal Nehru University alumni
21st-century Indian Muslims
Living people
Scientists from Jharkhand